The avian family Anatidae, commonly called waterfowl, comprise the ducks, geese, and swans. The International Ornithological Committee (IOC) recognizes these 174 Anatidae species distributed among 53 genera, 32 of which have only one species. Eight species on the list are extinct; they are marked (E).

This list is presented according to the IOC taxonomic sequence and can also be sorted alphabetically by common name and binomial.

References

Anatidae
Anatidae